Saúl Juárez Gil (born 28 November 1990) is a Mexican professional boxer who challenged for the WBC strawweight title in 2016 and the WBC light-flyweight title in 2018.

Career 
Juárez turned pro in 2010. He had a successful amateur career. Juárez won the Cinturón de Oro, an annual tournament for novice boxers, early on in his career. Juárez lost an IBF light-flyweight title eliminator to Milan Melindo in 2014. Juárez then beat Adrián Hernández twice on back-to-back fights and then defeated Oswaldo Novoa to earn a world title shot. On 2 August 2015, he faced Wanheng Menayothin for the WBC strawweight title in Chonburi. Wanheng seemed to control the fight, outjabbing and outboxing Juárez and won a close unanimous decision (116-112, 115–113, 116–113).

Juárez lost his next three fights, to Leroy Estrada, Gilberto Pedraza, and Abraham Rodríguez. Then he won against Gilberto Parra, stopping him with a barrage of punches in round 9. Juárez will get another world title shot on 31 December 2018 against Ken Shiro.

Professional boxing record

References 

1990 births
Living people
Mexican male boxers
Boxers from Mexico City
Mini-flyweight boxers
Light-flyweight boxers
20th-century Mexican people
21st-century Mexican people